John DiMaio (born November 27, 1955) is an American Republican Party politician, who was selected on February 21, 2009 to fill the  New Jersey General Assembly seat for the 23rd legislative district vacated by Marcia A. Karrow, after Karrow filled the vacancy for the New Jersey Senate in the same district. He has been co-chair of the Republican Conference, alongside Nancy Munoz, since January 14, 2020. He was elected Minority Leader of the General Assembly after Jon Bramnick was elected to the State Senate.

Early life 
DiMaio was born in Newton and raised in Hackettstown. He graduated from Hackettstown High School in 1974 and shortly thereafter was elected the president of the Hackettstown Democratic Club. While in high school, he was a charter member of the Hackettstown First Aid and Rescue Squad's Youth Squad, later joining the squad as a life member. He served as a member of the town council for 10 years as a Democrat starting in 1980 before resigning in late 1990 just after he was elected mayor. He began serving as mayor in 1991 and switched parties to join the Republicans in March 1995. DiMaio was a member of the Hackettstown Municipal Utilities Authority from 1991 until 1995 and rejoined it in 1999 where he continues to serve. In 1999, he was elected the president of the New Jersey Conference of Mayors. DiMaio was defeated by Democrat Roger Hines in his bid for re-election for mayor in 1999.

Warren County Commissioner 
In December 2000, when incumbent Republican Warren County Commissioner Susan Dickey was elected County Surrogate, DiMaio was chosen by the Warren County Republican Committee to fill the remainder of her term. Almost immediately, he was chosen as Board Director for the year of 2001. He was chosen as Freeholder Director again in 2008. While serving as Freeholder, he was a member of the North Jersey Transportation Planning Authority (2001 through 2009) serving as vice-chair in 2008. He is also the owner of A. DiMaio and Son, Inc., a general contracting business in Hackettstown. DiMaio lives in Hackettstown with his wife Gina and two daughters.

New Jersey Assembly 
On February 21, 2009, a special election was held by a convention of Republican committee members from Hunterdon and Warren counties to fill the vacant Assembly seat of Marcia A. Karrow. Karrow had earlier won a special election convention for the right to succeed Congressman Leonard Lance, who resigned from the Senate after his election to the U.S. House of Representatives. At the special election convention, DiMaio defeated Erik Peterson and Matt Holt, both members of the Hunterdon County Board of Chosen Freeholders. On the first ballot, the totals were: DiMaio 129, Peterson 104, and Holt 56. On the second runoff ballot, the totals were: DiMaio 153 and Peterson 141. DiMaio was sworn into office on March 16, 2009. He was assigned to serve as a member of the Agriculture and Natural Resources Committee and the Telecommunications and Utilities Committee. In the June 2009 Republican primary, DiMaio successfully defended his Assembly seat. He and his running mate, Hunterdon County Freeholder Erik Peterson, narrowly edged out Ed Smith for the two spots on the November general election ballot. DiMaio and Peterson defeated Democratic candidates William Courtney and Tammeisha Smith in the general election.

Committees 
Budget
Commerce and Economic Development
Joint Budget Oversight
Legislative Services Commission

District 23 

Each of the forty districts in the New Jersey Legislature has one representative in the New Jersey Senate and two members in the New Jersey General Assembly. The other representatives from the 23rd District for the 218th Legislature are:
Senator Michael J. Doherty (R)
Assemblyman John DiMaio (R)
Assemblyman Erik Peterson (R)

Electoral history

New Jersey Assembly

References

External links
Assemblyman John DiMaio's legislative web page, New Jersey Legislature
New Jersey Legislature financial disclosure forms
2010 2009 2008

|-

1955 births
21st-century American politicians
County commissioners in New Jersey
Hackettstown High School alumni
Living people
Mayors of places in New Jersey
New Jersey city council members
Republican Party members of the New Jersey General Assembly
People from Hackettstown, New Jersey
People from Newton, New Jersey
Politicians from Hunterdon County, New Jersey